28th National Board of Review Awards
December 20, 1956
The 28th National Board of Review Awards were announced on December 20, 1956.

Top Ten Films 
Around the World in 80 Days
Moby Dick
The King and I
Lust for Life
Friendly Persuasion
Somebody Up There Likes Me
The Catered Affair
Anastasia
The Man Who Never Was
Bus Stop

Top Foreign Films 
The Silent World
War and Peace
Richard III
La strada
Rififi

Winners 
Best Film: Around the World in 80 Days
Best Foreign Film: The Silent World
Best Actor: Yul Brynner (The King and I, Anastasia, The Ten Commandments)
Best Actress: Dorothy McGuire (Friendly Persuasion)
Best Supporting Actor: Richard Basehart (Moby Dick)
Best Supporting Actress: Debbie Reynolds (The Catered Affair)
Best Director: John Huston (Moby Dick)

External links 
National Board of Review of Motion Pictures :: Awards for 1956

National Board of Review Awards
National Board of Review Awards
National Board of Review Awards
National Board of Review Awards
National Board of Review Awards